This is a list of the heads of mission from the Habsburg Monarchy, Austrian Empire, and later Austria-Hungary, to France.

Envoys from the court of Vienna appeared as early as the 16th century, but France and the nascent Habsburg Empire were often decidedly hostile to one another, as the end of the Italian Wars showed that the two states had conflicting hegemonic interests. There was a permanent diplomatic mission in Paris from 1679.

Habsburg Envoy  
1680–1682: Heinrich Franz von Mansfeld
1683-1684?: Johann von Althann
1685-1685: Johann Friedrich von Seilern 
1685–1688: Wenzel Ferdinand Popel von Lobkowitz
1688-1699: Vacant (Nine Years' War)
1699–1701: Philipp Ludwig Wenzel von Sinzendorf
1701-1713: Vacant (War of the Spanish Succession)
1713–1714: Prinz Eugene of Savoy (Peace negotiations)
1714-1714: Johann Friedrich von Seilern (2nd term)
1714-1714: Johann Peter Goëss 
1715–1716: Johann Christoph Pentenriedter 
1717–1719: Dominik von Königsegg-Rothenfels
1719–1719: Marcus de Fonseca
1719–1728: Johann Christoph von Pentenriedter  (2nd term)
1729–1732: Stephan Wilhelm Kinsky 
1732–1733: Ignaz Johann Wasner, (Resident)
1733-1736: Vacant (War of the Polish Succession)
1736–1737: Leopold von Schmerling
1737–1741: Joseph Wenzel I, Prince of Liechtenstein
1741–1744: Paul Gundel
1744-1749: : Vacant (War of the Austrian Succession)
1749–1750: Johann von Mareschall
1750–1752: Wenzel Anton, Prince of Kaunitz-Rietberg (attaché: Ludwig von Zinzendorf)
1752–1753: Johann von Mareschall (2nd term)
1753–1766: Georg Adam, Prince of Starhemberg
1766–1790: Florimond Claude, Comte de Mercy-Argenteau
1790–1792: Franz Paul von Blumendorf (Chargé d’affaires)
1792–1801: Vacant (Wars of the French Revolution)
1801–1805: Philipp von Cobenzl

Ambassador extraordinary and plenipotentiary of the Austrian Empire

 1805–1806: Vacant 
 1806–1806: Peter von Floret (Chargé d'affaires)
 1806–1809: Klemens Wenzel von Metternich  
 1809–1813: Karl Philipp zu Schwarzenberg
 1813–1814: Vacant 
 1814–1814: Ludwig Philipp von Bombelles (Chargé d'affaires)
 1814–1825: Karl von Vincent 
 1825–1826: Friedrich Binder von Krieglstein (Chargé d'affaires)
 1826–1848: Anton von Apponyi  
 1848–1849: Ludwig von Thom (Chargé d'affaires)
 1849–1859: Alexander von Hübner
 1859–1867: Richard von Metternich

Austro-Hungarian Ambassador 

 1867–1871: Richard von Metternich
 1871–1876: Rudolf, Count of Apponyi
 1876–1878: Felix von Wimpffen
 1878–1882: Friedrich Ferdinand von Beust
 1882–1882: Felix von Wimpffen (2nd term)
 1883–1894: Ladislaus Hoyos-Sprinzenstein
 1894–1903: Anton von Wolkenstein-Trostburg
 1903–1910: Rudolf von Khevenhüller-Metsch
 1911–1914: Count Nikolaus Szécsen von Temerin

See also

 List of diplomatic missions of Austria-Hungary

References

Austria-Hungary
Ambassadors to France
Ambassadors to France
Ambassadors of Austria-Hungary to France